Nashom Benjamin Wooden (October 9, 1969 – March 23, 2020) was an American performing artist. Wooden was a member of the electronic dance music band The Ones and performed as a drag queen under the stage name Mona Foot.

Biography
Wooden was born in October 1969 and raised in Brooklyn, New York, and entered the New York nightlife scene as a Club Kid in the mid-1980s. By 1989, he worked in Manhattan running the men's clothing department at Patricia Field's boutique while developing the drag queen persona Mona Foot with his friend and former roommate Lady Bunny. Wooden credits RuPaul as an early mentor; RuPaul taught Wooden how to apply makeup, and both appeared in an off-Broadway play titled My Pet Homo. As Mona Foot, Wooden hosted the weekly drag competition "Mona Foot's Star Search" at the New York gay bar Barracuda, cited by The New York Times as a likely inspiration for the television series RuPaul's Drag Race.

In 1997, Wooden began to work as a bartender and DJ at The Cock, a gay bar. In 1999, he appeared in drag in the comedy-drama film Flawless. Along with JoJo Americo and Paul Alexander as the music group The Ones, Wooden co-wrote and performed the 2001 song "Flawless", which peaked at #4 on the Billboard Dance Club Songs chart, #7 in the United Kingdom, and #2 in Belgium. Later in his life, Wooden began to perform less frequently as Mona Foot, stating that "it just kind of fizzled out. I stopped taking gigs." Wooden gave his final performance as Mona Foot in 2018, where he revived the character for that year's Wigstock to perform as Wonder Woman.

Wooden was HIV-positive, though he had an undetectable viral load. On March 23, 2020, Wooden died at the age of 50 as a result of complications from a suspected case of COVID-19 in New York, in the midst of the COVID-19 pandemic in New York City. He was buried at Green-Wood Cemetery in Brooklyn, New York.

See also
 List of deaths due to COVID-19

References

External links
 

1969 births
2020 deaths
American drag queens
Burials at Green-Wood Cemetery
Deaths from the COVID-19 pandemic in New York (state)
Entertainers from the Bronx
American LGBT musicians
People with HIV/AIDS